During the Japanese occupation of Hong Kong, as part of their assimilation policy, Japanese governors advocated for the changing of English and Chinese place names of streets and buildings into Japanese, the official lingua franca. This is a partial list of all street names changed during the Japanese occupation; due to incomplete historical data, it is difficult to verify some place names in the table according to phonetic or transcript.

Administrative divisions

Location names

Hong Kong Island

Kowloon

New Territories

Street names

References 

Former administrative divisions of countries
Japanese occupation of Hong Kong
Axis powers